Merulaxis is a genus of bird in the family Rhinocryptidae.

Species
It contains the following species:

Species

 
Bird genera
Taxa named by René Lesson
Taxonomy articles created by Polbot